Andriy Volodymyrovych Tsurikov (born 5 October 1992) is a Ukrainian professional football defender who plays for Oleksandriya on loan from Metalist Kharkiv.

Career
Tsurikov is product of youth team system FC Metalurh Zaporizhzhia. His first coach was Volodymyr Shapovalov Made his debut for FC Metalurh entering as a full-time playing against FC Karpaty Lviv on 25 July 2010 in Ukrainian Premier League.

Honours
 Ukrainian Cup: 2013–14

References

External links
 
 

1992 births
Living people
Footballers from Zaporizhzhia
Ukrainian footballers
FC Metalurh Zaporizhzhia players
FC Metalurh-2 Zaporizhzhia players
FC Dynamo Kyiv players
FC Hoverla Uzhhorod players
Ukrainian Premier League players
Ukrainian First League players
Ukrainian Second League players
Super League Greece players
Association football defenders
Levadiakos F.C. players
Ukrainian expatriate footballers
Expatriate footballers in Greece
Ukrainian expatriate sportspeople in Greece
FC Oleksandriya players
FK Jablonec players
Ukrainian expatriate sportspeople in the Czech Republic
Expatriate footballers in the Czech Republic
SC Dnipro-1 players
FC Metalist Kharkiv players
Ukraine youth international footballers
Ukraine under-21 international footballers